Eurhinus magnificus, the jewel weevil, is a species of weevil native to South America. The species was originally described by Leonard Gyllenhaal in 1836.

Description 
Eurhinus magnificus is brilliantly coloured. Adults are approximately 5-6 mm long and 3-4 mm wide. Its host plant is Cissus verticillata.

Range 
Early descriptions from 1909 indicate that Eurhinus magnificus does not extend south of Nicaragua, however observations aggregated in GBIF suggest that the species moved more south towards Panama. According to the same records, the species has also been observed in Florida. The species might have been introduced to Florida through banana shipments from Costa Rica.

References

Taxa named by Leonard Gyllenhaal
Weevils